Melvin C. Foss (July 8, 1939 – January 3, 2022) was a Canadian football player who played for the Edmonton Eskimos.

References

1939 births
2022 deaths
Players of Canadian football from Alberta
Edmonton Elks players
Sportspeople from Lethbridge